Tito may refer to:

People

Mononyms
Josip Broz Tito (1892–1980), commonly known mononymously as Tito, Yugoslav communist revolutionary and statesman
Roberto Arias (1918–1989), aka Tito, Panamanian international lawyer, diplomat, and journalist
Tito (footballer, born 1943), full name Nílton Rosa, Brazilian football forward
Terry Francona (born 1959), nicknamed Tito after his father, baseball manager with Cleveland Guardians
Tito (footballer, born 1946), full name Tito José da Costa Santos, Portuguese footballer
Tito (footballer, born 1980), full name Bruno Miguel Areias de Sousa, Portuguese footballer
Tito (footballer, born May 1985), full name Alberto Ortiz Moreno, Spanish footballer
Tito (footballer, born July 1985), full name Roberto Román Triguero, Spanish footballer

Family name
Dennis Tito (born 1940), American businessman and astronaut
Diego Quispe Tito (1611–1681), Peruvian painter
Ettore Tito (1859–1941), Italian painter
Paul Tito (born 1978), New Zealand rugby player
Raúl Tito (born 1997), Peruvian footballer
Santi di Tito (1536–1603), Italian Mannerist painter
Teburoro Tito (born 1952), Kiribati president

Given name

A–L
Tito Alonso (1926–1979), Argentine film actor
Tito Arévalo (1911–2000), Filipino actor and musician
Tito Auger (born 1968), Puerto Rican musician
Tito El Bambino (born 1981), reggaeton musician
Tito Beltrán (born 1965), Chilean tenor
Tito Capobianco (1931–2018), Argentine stage and opera director
Tito Chingunji, Angolan UNITA rebel foreign secretary
Tito Colón (born 1982), Puerto Rican professional wrestler
Tito Francona (born 1933), former American outfielder/first baseman in Major League Baseball
Tito Fuentes (born 1944), Cuban-American second baseball player
Tito Fuentes, guitarist with  Mexican rock and hip hop band Molotov
Tito Gobbi (1913–1984), Italian baritone
Tito Guízar (1908–1999), Mexican singer and actor 
Tito Gómez (disambiguation), several people
Tito Gómez (Cuban singer) (1920–2000), Cuban singer
Tito Gómez (Puerto Rican singer) (1948–2007), Puerto Rican singer
Tito Gómez (painter) (born 1948), Cuban painter
Tito Horford (born 1966), Dominican professional basketball player 
Tito Jackson (born 1953), musician, member of the Jackson 5
Tito Karnavian (born 1964), Indonesian national police chief
Tito Kayak (born 1958), Puerto Rican environmental activist
Tito Landrum (born 1954), baseball player
Tito Larriva (born 1953), Mexican-American singer, musician and actor

M–Z
Tito Maddox (born 1981), American professional basketball player formerly in the NBA 
Tito Mboweni (born 1959), the eighth Governor of the South African Reserve Bank
Tito Munoz, also known as Tito the Builder from the 2008 United States presidential election
Tito Muñoz (born 1983), American conductor
Tito Nieves (born 1959), Puerto-Rico American, one of the leading Salsa singers of the 1980s and early 90s
Tito Okello (1914–1996), Ugandan general
Tito Ortiz (born 1975), mixed martial arts competitor
Tito Puente (1923–2000), Latin jazz musician
Tito Rodríguez (1923–1973), band-leader
Tito Rojas (1955–2020), salsa band-leader
Tito Santana (born 1953), Tejano professional wrestler
Tito Sarrocchi (1824–1900), Italian sculptor
Tito Schipa (1888–1965), Italian tenor
Tito Sotto (born 1948), senator in the Philippines Congress, actor and singer
Tito Steiner (born 1952), Argentine decathlete
Tito Tebaldi (born 1987), Italian rugby union player
Tito Trinidad (born 1973, Félix Trinidad), Puerto Rican professional boxer
Tito Vilanova (1968–2014), Spanish football player and manager

Fictional characters
Tito Bohusk, a fictional mutant character in the Marvel Comics Universe
Tito Makani, a character on Rocket Power
Tito Dick, a character in the animated series The Nutshack
Tito (Oliver & Company), a Chihuahua in Disney's Oliver & Company
Tito Swing, a member of the Jukebox puppet band on Shining Time Station

Arts and entertainment
Tito (miniseries), a 2010 Croatian documentary miniseries about Josip Broz Tito
, a Yugoslav documentary film
Tito (2004 film), an Egyptian action film
Tito (2019 film), a Canadian drama film

Places
Tito, Basilicata, town in the province of Potenza, Italy

See also
TITO (disambiguation)

Spanish masculine given names